Draghi is an Italian surname (from the plural of drago, "dragon") and may refer to:

 Antonio Draghi (1634–1700), Italian composer
 Giovanni Battista Draghi (composer) (1640–1708), Anglo-Italian composer
 Giovanni Evangelista Draghi (1657–1712), Italian painter
 Mario Draghi (born 1947), Italian economist and president of the European Central Bank (2011–2019), Prime Minister of Italy (2021–present)